Sunetra Gas Field is a natural gas field located in Sunamganj-Netrokona, Bangladesh. It is controlled by Bangladesh Petroleum Exploration and Production Company Limited (BAPEX).

Location 
Sunetra gas field is located in Gabi village of Selbarsha union, Dharmapasha Upazila, Sunamganj district of Sylhet division and Barhatta Upazila of Netrokona district of Mymensingh division. It is located 59km south-west of Chhatak gas field and 69km north-west of Bibiyana gas field. BAPEX conducted a two-dimensional seismic surveys in a total of 259 km in Sunamganj-Netrokona district in the year 2009-2010 and identified this gas field. The gas field has been named 'Sunetra' as some of it fell under Sunamganj, while the other in Netrakona.

See also 
List of natural gas fields in Bangladesh
Bangladesh Gas Fields Company Limited
Gas Transmission Company Limited

References 

2009 establishments in Bangladesh
Economy of Sylhet
Natural gas fields in Bangladesh
Sunamganj District